Mitchell Glenn Donald (born 10 December 1988) is a professional footballer who plays as a midfielder. He previously played for AFC Ajax, where he went through the youth program. Born in the Netherlands, he represents the Suriname national team.

Club career

Ajax

Born in Nieuw-Vennep, Donald joined Ajax following spells at amateur sides SV Bijlmer and A.V.V. Zeeburgia. He joined the first team of Ajax after the 2006–07 winter break in February 2007. Donald made his professional Ajax debut under manager Henk ten Cate on 14 February 2007 in the UEFA Cup clash against SV Werder Bremen. In August 2007 he participated in the 1–0 win over PSV Eindhoven to clinch the Johan Cruijff-schaal, his first trophy. Donald made his Eredivisie debut on 23 September 2007 in a match against AZ, coming on as a substitute for Klaas-Jan Huntelaar. He went on to make two more substitutes appearances in the 2007–08 season, on 25 November 2007 against Vitesse Arnhem and on 13 January 2008 against AZ.

Donald made no appearances in the Eredivisie in the 2008–09 season under manager Marco van Basten after being badly injured in pre-season at the Amsterdam Tournament in a challenge on Inter's Adriano, but he reestablished himself in the squad following the appointment of Martin Jol.
 On 27 July 2009, almost exactly a year after injuring himself there, Donald appeared once again at the Amsterdam Tournament in a match against S.L. Benfica. Jol stated that the game of Donald was "surprising" and that his game was "very good and beautiful for such a young player. It also gives confidence and that is important". On 20 August 2009 he came on as a substitute in the UEFA Europa League match against Slovan Bratislava, and was in the starting lineup the following week in the away return match. On 20 September 2009, Donald played his first Eredivisie match in 20 months, coming on as a substitute in an away match against VVV-Venlo. On 11 December 2009 (one day after his 21st birthday), Donald scored his first Eredivisie goal for Ajax in a 3–0 victory over N.E.C.

Loan spell at Willem II
On 29 January 2010, Willem II signed the midfielder on loan from AFC Ajax until June 2011, where he joined his Ajax teammate Jan-Arie van der Heijden. On 5 February 2010, Donald scored on his debut for the club from Tilburg in a 2–1 loss to NAC Breda. Playing with Willem II, Donald collected 18 appearances at total, including 4 matches in relegation play-off.

Roda JC
On 2 February 2011 Donald signed a contract for Roda JC, but he first joined on 1 July 2011 to his new team. Donald made his official debut for Roda JC replacing Laurent Delorge in 3–0 defeat against Feyenoord on 13 August 2011. While with the club, Donald collected 102 matches in all competitions for three seasons at total, scoring 16 goals.

Mordovia
In summer 2014 he signed with Russian Premier League side Mordovia Saransk.

Red Star Belgrade

On 12 August 2015, he signed a 6-months loan deal with Serbian side Red Star Belgrade, with option for permanent 2-year deal, under the condition that  he appear in more than half the league games until the 2015-16 winter break. On 18 January 2016, it was announced that Donald had signed a 1.5-year contract with Red Star lasting until June 2017. In march 2016, it was announced that his gross salary amounts to 1.005.030 euros.

On 27 July 2017, Donald became the first foreign captain in the club history, leading the team in 2–0 victory over Sparta Prague. He made his hundredth appearance for the club in the Eternal Derby, played on 13 December 2017. Scoring a goal in 2–1 away victory over Vojvodina on 7 March 2018, Donald archived his 104 match for Red Star Belgrade, equalizing with Carlos Eduardo de Fiori Mendes as a most capable foreign footballer in the club history. Several days later, on Friday 9 March, he was hospitalized due to cardiac problems.

On 14 April 2018, Donald became the most capped foreign footballer in the club's history. Replacing Nemanja Radonjić in 81 minute of the Eternal Derby, Donald noted his 105th official game with Red Star Belgrade. He had been sent off after conflict with Seydouba Soumah on the field in last minutes of the match. On 19 May 2018, Donald scored in the final match of the 2017–18 Serbian SuperLiga season, against Voždovac for winning the second trophy with the club. The match was noted as his last under contract with Red Star, after he refused to sign new deal.

Yeni Malatyaspor
Donald moved to Turkey in summer 2018 by signing with Yeni Malatyaspor.

Grafičar Beograd
In January 2023, after a year and a half without a club, Donald joined Serbian First League club Grafičar Beograd on tryout.

International career
Born in the Netherlands, Donald is of Surinamese descent. He made 3 appearances for the Netherlands Under-21 team in 2009. He debuted with the Suriname national team in a 6–0 2022 FIFA World Cup qualification win over Bermuda on 4 June 2021. A few weeks later on 25 June Donald was named to the Suriname squad for the 2021 CONCACAF Gold Cup.

Personal life
He is the older brother of the footballer Joël Donald. In late 2017, Donald owned a hookah lounge in Belgrade.
Donald is the father of 2 daughters and is married to Esra Donald

Career statistics

Honours
Ajax
 Eredivisie: 2010–11
 KNVB Cup: 2006–07
 Johan Cruijff Shield: 2007

Red Star Belgrade
 Serbian SuperLiga (2): 2015–16, 2017–18

Individual
 Serbian SuperLiga Team of the Season (2): 2015–16, 2016–17

References

External links
 Voetbal International profile 
 
 
 Mitchell Donald Interview

1988 births
Living people
People from Haarlemmermeer
Association football midfielders
Footballers from North Holland
Surinamese footballers
Dutch footballers
Netherlands under-21 international footballers
A.V.V. Zeeburgia players
AFC Ajax players
Jong Ajax players
Willem II (football club) players
Roda JC Kerkrade players
FC Mordovia Saransk players
Red Star Belgrade footballers
Yeni Malatyaspor footballers
Büyükşehir Belediye Erzurumspor footballers
Eredivisie players
Russian Premier League players
Serbian SuperLiga players
Süper Lig players
Suriname international footballers
Dutch sportspeople of Surinamese descent
Surinamese expatriate footballers
Dutch expatriate footballers
Expatriate footballers in Russia
Expatriate footballers in Serbia
Expatriate footballers in Turkey
Surinamese expatriate sportspeople in Russia
Surinamese expatriate sportspeople in Serbia
Surinamese expatriate sportspeople in Turkey
Dutch expatriate sportspeople in Russia
Dutch expatriate sportspeople in Serbia
Dutch expatriate sportspeople in Turkey
2021 CONCACAF Gold Cup players